The 2010–2011 Queensland Flood and Cyclone Citation is a Queensland honour established by the Governor-of-Queensland-in-Council in 2011.

Description

The citation consists of a maroon ribbon with four white vertical stripes surrounded by a bronze metallic frame.  The four white stripes represent the four emergency service agencies that existed at the time of the event - Queensland Fire and Rescue Service, Queensland Ambulance Service, Emergency Management Queensland and the Queensland Police Service.

The cyclone symbols on both sides of the citation represents the time line of cyclonic events occurring between Cyclone Tasha in December 2010 and Cyclone Yasi in February 2011.  The swirls on the top and bottom of the citation represents waves associated with the mass flooding which occurred throughout many parts of Queensland.

Eligibility

The group citation was issued to employees and volunteers of the Department of Community Safety who performed duty on at least one shift at any time between 1 December 2010 and 28 February 2011.  Duty performed may be in direct response to the flood and cyclone events or in maintaining core business during this period.

Members of the following agencies were awarded the citation:

 Queensland
 Emergency Management Queensland
 Queensland Ambulance Service
 Queensland Fire and Rescue Service
 Queensland Police Service
 Saint John Ambulance 
 Queensland State Emergency Service
 Surf Life Saving Queensland
 Australian Capital Territory
 ACT State Emergency Service
 New South Wales
 Ambulance Service of NSW
 NSW Fire Brigades
 NSW Police Force
 NSW State Emergency Service
 South Australia
 SA Police
 SA State Emergency Service
 Tasmania
 Tasmania State Emergency Service
 Victoria
 Victoria Police
 Victoria State Emergency Service
 Western Australia
 WA State Emergency Service
Northern Territory
Northern Territory Fire and Rescue Service
Northern Territory Emergency Service
 National
 Australian Federal Police
 Australian Volunteer Coast Guard 
 St John Ambulance Australia

See also

 Queensland Honours
 Australian Honours System
 National Emergency Medal with 'QLD 2010-11' clasp

References

 

Civil awards and decorations of Australia
Awards established in 2011